is a railway station on Kintetsu Railway's Nara Line, located in the city of Nara, Nara Prefecture, Japan.

Building
The station has 2 side platforms and 2 tracks.

History
 1969 - Opened since Aburasaka Station is abandoned.
 2000 - Promoted to Rapid Express stops.
 2003 - Kyoto line Rapid Express is discontinued.
 2007 - Starts using PiTaPa.

Adjacent stations

References

Railway stations in Japan opened in 1969
Railway stations in Nara Prefecture
Buildings and structures in Nara, Nara